Uvaricin is a bis(tetrahydrofuranoid) fatty acid lactone that was first isolated in 1982 from the roots of the Annonaceae Uvaria acuminata. Uvaricin was the first known example in a class of compounds known as acetogenins. Acetogenins, which are found in plants of the family Annonaceae, seem to kill cells by inhibiting NADH dehydrogenase in the mitochondrion. A method to synthesize uvaricin was first published in 1998, and an improved stereoselective synthesis published in 2001.

References 

Acetate esters
Tetrahydrofurans
Furanones
Polyketides